Olszanica may refer to the following places in Poland:
Olszanica, part of the Zwierzyniec district of Kraków
Olszanica, Lower Silesian Voivodeship (south-west Poland)
Olszanica, Podlaskie Voivodeship (north-east Poland)
Olszanica, Pomeranian Voivodeship (north Poland)
Olszanica, Subcarpathian Voivodeship (south-east Poland)